The mammoth wasp (Megascolia maculata) is a very large wasp (the largest in Europe), with the female reaching up to , whereas the male is smaller. The species can be seen in warm weather, from May to September.

Description
The mammoth wasp resembles a very large, elongated bumble bee. The female is larger than the male and has a yellow head, the male has a black head. Its body is covered in downy hair and is glossy black in colour with two yellow bands across its abdomen which are sometimes divided to form four yellow spots. Females have shorter antennae than males. The female also has large mandibles which are used to manipulate the prey.

Distribution
The mammoth wasp occurs in southern Europe as far north as the Czech Republic, where it was first recorded in 2013, into Russia, North Africa and the near east. It has been recorded in southern Great Britain but as its prey does not occur in Britain it will be unable to establish there.

Habitat
The mammoth wasp is found in Mediterranean type habitats such as oak forests, maquis and garrigue. It can only occur where its prey, the European rhinoceros beetle Oryctes nasicornis, is found too and in Russia it has been noted that it is commonest around human habitation where manure piles, sawmills and compost heaps provide habitat for its prey.

Biology
The adult mammoth wasps feed on nectar from flowers. In Malta they have been associated with wild artichoke and Carpobrotus edulis. The female hunts in dead wood for the grubs of the European rhinoceros beetle which it paralyses by stinging it and then lays a single egg on the larva. The larval wasp consumes the beetle larva apart from its skin. Once the beetle larva had been consumed the wasp larva builds a cocoon and pupates, emerging from the cocoon as an adult in the following spring.

In culture

It is suggested as the insect model used for the gold "Malia Pendant", a jewel of high quality gold-smithery of the Minoan times.

Gallery

References

External links
 Megascolia maculata flavifrons

Scoliidae
Hymenoptera of Europe
Insects described in 1773